Atheyna Bylon (born April 6, 1989) is a Panamanian boxer. Is a police officer. She started at 19 years old, and  competed at the 2016 Summer Olympics in the women's middleweight event, in which she was eliminated in the round of 16 by Andreia Bandeira.

References

1989 births
Living people
Panamanian women boxers
Olympic boxers of Panama
Boxers at the 2016 Summer Olympics
Boxers at the 2020 Summer Olympics
South American Games gold medalists for Panama
South American Games medalists in boxing
Competitors at the 2018 South American Games
Boxers at the 2019 Pan American Games
Pan American Games competitors for Panama
Middleweight boxers
AIBA Women's World Boxing Championships medalists